Pūrṇimā is the word for full moon in Sanskrit. The day of Purnima is the day (Tithi) in each month when the full moon occurs, and marks the division in each month between the two lunar fortnights (paksha), and the Moon is aligned exactly in a straight line, called a syzygy, with the Sun and Earth. Full moon is considered the third of the four primary phases of the Moon; the other three phases are new moon, first quarter moon, and third quarter moon. The full moon shows 100% illumination, causes high tides, and can concur with lunar eclipses.

Festivals
The following festivals occur on Purnima. When the Manava Purana (one of Upa Purana) narrated The festivals of full moon days. 
 Kartik Poornima, is celebrated on the full moon day of the month of Kartik. It is also called Tripura Purnima.
 Shravan Poornima, is the full moon day in Shravan. This day has a number of different names. Hayagriva Jayanti and Gayatri jayanti is also celebrated on Shravana Purnima. It is also known as Raksha Bandhan
 Vat Purnima is celebrated on the full moon day of the month of Jyeshta. Women pray for their husbands by tying threads around a banyan tree (Vat) on this day. It honors Savitri, the legendary wife of Satyavan who escaped death for her husband's life. It is the chosen day for worshipping Yama deva
 Guru Purnima, devotees offer puja (worship) to their Guru, on the full moon day of Ashadha. This is well known as Vyasa Purnima (Sanskrit. व्यास) after the birthday of Vyasa, the author of Mahabharata who is declared as the guru of all in the Shiva Purana.
 Sharad Purnima or Kojagiri purnima, the Autumn Harvest Festival, on the full moon day of Ashvina.
 Buddha Purnima, the day of birth, enlightenment and death of Gautama Buddha, on the full moon day of Vaishakha. Kurma Jayanti is also celebrated on the day.
 Holi/Phalgun Purnima, the Spring Festival of Colours in Hinduism/Buddhism/Jainism, the full moon day in Phalgun.
 Dattātreya Jayanti is celebrated on the full moon day of the month of Margashira.
 Hanuman Jayanti is celebrated on the full moon of the lunar month Chaitra. However, this is celebrated on different days in different states. While Orissa celebrates this as Vaisakha Sankranti, Andhra Pradesh celebrates Vaisakha shukla paksha dashami, Kerala celebrates it in a previous month Margashira Amavasya coinciding with Mula Nakshatra. Chaitra Purnima is the chosen day for donation of rice to please Sri Chandra Deva, Moon god.
 Shakambhari Purnima is celebrated on the full moon day of the month of Pausha
 Shraddha Purnima is celebrated on the full moon day of the month of Bhaadra. On this day Uma Maheswara Vrata as well as Shakra Vrata where Indra is worshiped for children .well-being.

References

External links
 Introduction to the Hindu Calendar (PDF)

Observances held on the full moon
Hindu calendar
Days of the Hindu calendar